Sex and the Other Man (also known as Captive) is a 1995 American comedy and drama film directed by Karl Slovin. This film features music composed by Anton Sanko. The film starring Stanley Tucci, Kari Wuhrer, Ron Eldard and Conrad Goode in the lead roles.

Cast
 Stanley Tucci
 Kari Wuhrer
 Ron Eldard
 Conrad Goode
 Jordan Foster

References

External links
 
 

1995 films
1995 comedy-drama films
American comedy-drama films
1990s English-language films
1990s American films